Jerusa Geber dos Santos (born 26 April 1982) is a visually impaired Brazilian sprinter. Competing in the T11 classification, Geber has competed at two Summer Paralympic Games, winning two silver and a bronze medal. She is also a multiple World Championships and Parapan American medalist, taking ten medals over five tournaments. She qualified for the 2020 Summer Paralympics, in Women's 100m T11, and Women's 200m T11.

Life
She was born with cataracts in 1982 and after having glaucoma she became totally blind when she was eighteen. When she was nineteen a friend suggested that she should take up athletics and in 2005 she first represented her country. She is supported by her husband, Luiz Henrique da Silva, who has been her guide in some T11 races.

She won a bronze medal at the 2008 Summer Paralympics, and two silver medals at the 2012 Summer Paralympics.
She won a gold medal in Lima at the 2019 Parapan American Games and in the same year she won another at the World Championships in Dubai.

She was one of the first dozen paralympians cleared to compete at the Tokyo Paralympics postponed to 2021. Other early choices to be included were Thalita Simplício (who also competes in T11), Rayane Soares (T13), Beth Gomes (F52), Claudiney Batista (F56), Cícero Valdiran (F57) and Thiago Paulino.

References

External links
 
 

1982 births
Living people
People from Rio Branco, Acre
Brazilian female sprinters
Paralympic athletes of Brazil
Athletes (track and field) at the 2008 Summer Paralympics
Athletes (track and field) at the 2012 Summer Paralympics
Athletes (track and field) at the 2016 Summer Paralympics
Athletes (track and field) at the 2020 Summer Paralympics
Paralympic bronze medalists for Brazil
Paralympic silver medalists for Brazil
Medalists at the 2008 Summer Paralympics
Medalists at the 2012 Summer Paralympics
Medalists at the 2020 Summer Paralympics
Paralympic medalists in athletics (track and field)
Medalists at the 2011 Parapan American Games
Medalists at the 2015 Parapan American Games
Medalists at the 2019 Parapan American Games
Sportspeople from Acre (state)
21st-century Brazilian women